In algebraic geometry, graded manifolds are extensions of the concept of manifolds based on ideas coming from supersymmetry and supercommutative algebra. Both graded manifolds and supermanifolds are phrased in terms of sheaves of graded commutative algebras. However, graded manifolds are characterized by sheaves on smooth manifolds, while supermanifolds are constructed by gluing of sheaves of supervector spaces.

Graded manifolds
Sections of the sheaf  are called graded functions on a graded manifold . The well-known Batchelor theorem and Serre–Swan theorem characterize graded manifolds as follows.

Serre–Swan theorem for graded manifolds
Let  be a graded manifold.

Let  be a smooth manifold. A graded commutative -algebra is isomorphic to the structure ring of a graded manifold with a body  if and only if it is the exterior algebra of some projective -module of finite rank.

Graded functions
Note that above mentioned Batchelor's isomorphism fails to be canonical, but it often is fixed from the beginning. Graded functions on such a chart are -valued functions

 ,

Graded vector fields
They constitute a real Lie superalgebra  with respect to the superbracket

 ,

Graded vector fields locally read

 .

They act on graded functions  by the rule

 .

Graded exterior forms
The -dual of the module graded vector fields  is called the module of graded exterior one-forms . Graded exterior one-forms locally read  so that the duality (interior) product

 .

Provided with the graded exterior product

 ,

graded one-forms generate the graded exterior algebra  of graded exterior forms on a graded manifold. They obey the relation

 ,

The graded exterior algebra  is a graded differential algebra with respect to the graded exterior differential

 ,

There are
the familiar relations

 .

Graded differential geometry
In the category of graded manifolds, one considers graded Lie groups, graded bundles and graded principal bundles. One also introduces the notion of jets of graded
manifolds, but they differ from jets of graded bundles.

Graded differential calculus
The differential calculus on graded manifolds is formulated as the differential calculus over graded commutative algebras similarly to the differential calculus over commutative algebras.

Physical outcome
Due to the above-mentioned Serre–Swan theorem, odd classical
fields on a smooth manifold are described in terms of graded
manifolds. Extended to graded manifolds, the variational bicomplex provides the strict mathematical formulation of
Lagrangian classical field theory and Lagrangian BRST theory.

See also
 Connection (algebraic framework)
 Graded (mathematics)
 Serre–Swan theorem
 Supergeometry
 Supermanifold
 Supersymmetry

References
 C. Bartocci, U. Bruzzo, D. Hernandez Ruiperez, The Geometry of Supermanifolds (Kluwer, 1991) 
 T. Stavracou, Theory of connections on graded principal bundles, Rev. Math. Phys. 10 (1998) 47
 B. Kostant, Graded manifolds, graded Lie theory, and prequantization, in Differential Geometric Methods in Mathematical Physics, Lecture Notes in Mathematics 570 (Springer, 1977) p. 177
 A. Almorox, Supergauge theories in graded manifolds, in Differential Geometric Methods in Mathematical Physics, Lecture Notes in Mathematics 1251 (Springer, 1987) p. 114
 D. Hernandez Ruiperez, J. Munoz Masque, Global variational calculus on graded manifolds, J. Math. Pures Appl. 63 (1984) 283
 G. Giachetta, L. Mangiarotti, G. Sardanashvily, Advanced Classical Field Theory (World Scientific, 2009) ; ; .

External links
 G. Sardanashvily, Lectures on supergeometry, .

Supersymmetry
Generalized manifolds